Zamanfou, also known as "ochaderfismos" (Greek "ωχαδερφισμός") is a widely accepted as prevalent attitude/approach to life in Greece that is nevertheless classed by some as a counterculture phenomenon, which involves social loafing as its principal characteristic.

Etymology
The term is derived from the French phrase "je m'en fous" (foutre). The French expression Je m'en fous became known by the Greeks before World War II, when the French language was the most common foreign language in Greece. It was later adopted into everyday slang vocabulary, with Greek spelling and pronunciation. It is roughly equivalent to the English 'I don't care'.

The associated term "ochaderfismos" derives from the Greek phrase "oh brother!" (ωχ αδερφέ!).

Background
Although zamanfou might be considered a social phenomenon in Greece, it is no different from social loafing, as this appears in other cultures or epochs.

Zamanfou in popular culture
"Zamanfou" is the title of a Greek song by Sakis Boulas.
"Zamanfou" is the title of a Greek hip-hop song by the rapper Eisvoleas.
Zamanfou was the title of a Greek TV show by Annita Pania.
"Zamanfou" is the title of a Greek hip-hop song by the rapper Taraxias featuring Sakis Boulas and Vasia Patrikarea (new version of the Sakis Boulas song).

See also
Social loafing
Nihilism
Cynicism
Ethical egoism
Apathy

References

Counterculture
Social classes
Greek culture